The 1990 Sam Houston State Bearkats football team represented Sam Houston State University as a member of the Southland Conference during the 1990 NCAA Division I-AA football season. Led by ninth-year head coach Ron Randleman, the Bearkats compiled an overall record of 4–7 with a mark of 3–3 in conference play, and finished tied for third in the Southland.

Schedule

References

Sam Houston State
Sam Houston Bearkats football seasons
Sam Houston State Bearkats football